Paris Métro Line 7 is one of sixteen lines of the Paris Métro system. Crossing the capital from its north-eastern to south-eastern sections via a moderately curved path, it links La Courneuve – 8 mai 1945 in the north with Mairie d'Ivry and Villejuif – Louis Aragon in the south, while passing through important parts of central Paris.

Line 7 began operating in 1910 and, along with Line 13, is one of only two Métro lines that splits into branches. Originally, this was in the northeast and splitting at Louis Blanc, which was separated in 1967 to become Line 7bis. In 1982, a new branch was added in the southeast to Mairie d'Ivry, branching off at Maison Blanche.  Line 7 has only steel rails.

At , Line 7 is one of the longest in the Paris Métro network. In addition, it contains the most stations as well as being the third most-used line of the Métro, with 120.7 million riders in 2004.

History

Chronology
5 November 1910: Line 7 was opened linking Opéra to Porte de la Villette.
18 January 1911: A new branch was opened from Louis Blanc to Pré-Saint-Gervais.
1 July 1916: The line was extended in the south from Opéra to Palais Royal.
16 April 1926: The line was extended from Palais Royal to Pont Marie.
15 February 1930: While a tunnel was being built on line 7 to cross the River Seine, a new section between Place Monge and Place d'Italie was opened and temporarily operated as part of Line 10.
3 June 1930: The line was extended from Pont Marie to Pont de Sully.
7 March 1930: That section temporarily operating as part of Line 10 was extended from Place d'Italie to Porte de Choisy.
26 April 1931: The section between Pont de Sully and Place Monge was opened.  The section between Place Monge and Porte de Choisy was transferred to Line 7 and it was extended to Porte d'Ivry simultaneously.
1 May 1946: The line was extended from Porte d'Ivry to Mairie d'Ivry.
1967: Because of a lack of traffic, the northern branch of the line 7 between Louis Blanc and Pré-Saint-Gervais became a new independent line known as Line 7bis.
4 October 1979: The line was extended to the north from Porte de la Villette to Fort d'Aubervilliers.
10 December 1982: A new branch was opened to the south from Maison Blanche to Le Kremlin-Bicêtre.
28 February 1985 : The line was extended from Le Kremlin-Bicêtre to Villejuif Louis Aragon.
6 May 1987: The line was extended from Fort d'Aubervilliers to La Courneuve – 8 mai 1945.

Future
An extension of Line 7 from La Courneuve to Le Bourget may be considered in the future.
Line 7bis, the branch line of line 7, may be merged with line 3bis to form a new line, with its western terminus at Château-Landon on line 7.

Route and stations

Route
Line 7 runs for  completely underground, stopping at 38 stations. Southbound trains terminate alternately at Villejuif - Louis Aragon and Mairie d'Ivry, diverging at Maison Blanche.  Late at night, through trains only operate to Mairie d'Ivry; a shuttle train to Villejuif originates at Maison Blanche.

In the north, the line begins at La Courneuve in the department of Seine-Saint-Denis at the intersection of National Routes 2 and 186. La Courneuve station acts as a transfer between the Métro and Paris' fragmented, suburban tramway system, with a station on Paris Tramway Line 1 (T1). Unlike most stations in Paris, there are three tracks, the central one used for departures and arrivals.

Running below National Route 2 (RN2), the line heads to the south-west, entering Paris in two single-line tunnels so as to avoid a now-unused terminal loop at Porte de la Villette. It then descends a 4% grade below Canal Saint-Denis and then climbs back up to stop at Corentin Cariou. Two stations beyond, Line 7 reaches Stalingrad, an important transfer point in the Métro system, where the line turns to run below Rue La Fayette.

Renamed stations

Tourism
Metro Line 7 passes near several places of interest :
The Parc de la Villette with the Cités des Sciences et de l'Industrie.
The Opera Garnier.
The Latin Quarter.
Place d'Italie and the Butte aux Cailles.
One of Paris' "Chinatowns" in the south of the 13th arrondissement.

See also

References

External links

  RATP Official Website (French)
  RATP English-language website
  Interactive Map of the RER (from RATP's website)
  Interactive Map of the Paris Métro (from RATP's website)
  Mobidf website, dedicated to the RER (unofficial)
  Metro-Pole website, dedicated to Paris public transport (unofficial)

 
Railway lines opened in 1910